Lemyra melanosoma is a moth of the family Erebidae. It was described by George Hampson in 1894. It is found in China (Sichuan, Yunnan, Shaanxi, Tibet, Hubei, Hunan), Pakistan, eastern India (Kulu, Sikkim, Darjiling, Khasi Hills), Myanmar and Thailand.

References

 

melanosoma
Moths described in 1894